German submarine U-772 was a Type VIIC U-boat of Nazi Germany's Kriegsmarine during World War II.

The U-boat was laid down on 21 September 1942 at the Kriegsmarinewerft Wilhelmshaven (KMW), launched on 31 October 1943, and commissioned on 23 December 1943, commanded by Oberleutnant zur See Ewald Rademacher.

Design
German Type VIIC submarines were preceded by the shorter Type VIIB submarines. U-772 had a displacement of  when at the surface and  while submerged. She had two shafts and two  propellers.

U-772 was fitted with five  torpedo tubes (four fitted at the bow and one at the stern), fourteen torpedoes, one  SK C/35 naval gun, (220 rounds), one  Flak M42 and two twin  C/30 anti-aircraft guns. The boat had a complement of between forty-four and sixty.

War patrols
After the usual six-month shakedown and training period in the Baltic, U-772 sailed from Trondheim on 13 August 1944 for her first war patrol, which lasted for 55 days out in the North Atlantic, however she had no success.

She sailed from Trondheim on 19 November 1944 on her second patrol, circling the British Isles. On 17 December 1944 U-772 was sunk by depth charges from the British Colony class frigate  in the North Atlantic, south of Cork, in position  with the loss of all 48 hands.

References

Bibliography

External links

German Type VIIC submarines
U-boats commissioned in 1943
U-boats sunk in 1944
1943 ships
World War II submarines of Germany
Ships built in Wilhelmshaven
World War II shipwrecks in the Celtic Sea
U-boats sunk by depth charges
U-boats sunk by British warships
Ships lost with all hands
Maritime incidents in December 1944